Kachhauna Patseni is a town and a nagar panchayat in Sandila tehsil of Hardoi district, Uttar Pradesh, India. It was first upgraded to urban status for the 1981 census. As of 2011, its population is 15,647, in 2,772 households. The Kachhauna community development block encompasses the rural areas surrounding the town.

Demographics

 India census, Kachhauna Patseni had a population of 13,504. Males constitute 54% of the population and females 46%. Kachhauna Patseni has an average literacy rate of 61%, higher than the national average of 59.5%: male literacy is 69%, and female literacy is 52%.

Economy
As of 1981, Kachhauna Patseni's three main imports were sugar, fertilizer, and kerosene oil. The three main commodities manufactured in town were rice, mustard oil, and tin boxes. The three largest exports were paddy, groundnut, and wheat.

Villages
Kachhauna block contains the following 46 villages:

References

Cities and towns in Hardoi district